MacConnell's bat (Mesophylla macconnelli), is a bat species from South and Central America. It is the only species within the genus Mesophylla.

References

Phyllostomidae
Bats of South America
Bats of Brazil
Mammals of Colombia

Bats of Central America
Mammals described in 1901
Taxa named by Oldfield Thomas